Badr Bilal (Arabic:بدر بلال) (born 2 July 1996) is an Emirati footballer. He currently plays for Al Bataeh as a winger .

Career
He formerly played for Al-Shaab, Al Urooba, Masafi, and Dibba.

References

External links
 

1996 births
Living people
Emirati footballers
Al-Shaab CSC players
Al Urooba Club players
Masafi Club players
Dibba FC players
Al Bataeh Club players
UAE Pro League players
UAE First Division League players
Association football wingers
Place of birth missing (living people)